Rama Gharti is a Nepalese politician belonging to CPN (Unified Socialist). She is also serving as member of Provincial Assembly of Lumbini Province.

She is currently serving as Minister for Law, Women, Children and Senior Citizens of Lumbini Province.

See also 

 CPN (Unified Socialist)
 Som Prasad Pandey

References 

Communist Party of Nepal (Unified Socialist) politicians
Year of birth missing (living people)
Living people
Provincial cabinet ministers of Nepal
Members of the Provincial Assembly of Lumbini Province